Llanybri is a rural farming village situated near the estuary of the River Tywi in Carmarthenshire, Wales.
The parish of Llansteffan consists of two distinct villages with separate churches: Llansteffan by the estuary and Llanybri inland on the hilltop.

Description and history

Llanybri was a demesne manor of the Lords of Llansteffan and Penrhyn and appears to be an early nucleation around a central open space, adjacent to a chapel dedicated to St Mary that had been established, as ‘Morabrichurch’, by the 14th century at least and was, in the 16th century, called ‘Marbell Church’. An area of common land lay within the village and may have Medieval origins. Pendegy Mill, some 700m west of the village, is the site of the Medieval ‘Mundegy Mill’. Rees (1932) depicts Llanybri as a borough, and though the designation is most unlikely the settlement did lie at the junction of seven routeways.

Writers 
The writers Lynette Roberts and Keidrych Rhys lived in the village. Dylan Thomas was a frequent visitor to the village pub, the Farmers' Arms, both when he lived near Llansteffan and in Laugharne. The landlady gave an account of his visits. 

Thomas' maternal aunt, Anne Gwyn, once lived in Plas Uchaf, while one of  his great-aunts had lived in Plas Isaf.

References

External links
BBC Domesday page
Poem from Llanybri

Villages in Carmarthenshire
Carmarthen Bay